You Do Your Thing is the fourth studio album by American country music duo Montgomery Gentry. It was released in 2004 (see 2004 in country music) and has been certified platinum by the RIAA. The album produced the duo's first Number One hit on the Billboard country music charts in "If You Ever Stop Loving Me"; other singles included the title track, "Gone", and "Something to Be Proud Of" (also a Number One).

"If It's the Last Thing I Do" was also recorded by Brooks & Dunn on their 2001 album, Steers & Stripes, and in 2004 by James Otto on his album Days of Our Lives. Both of these renditions were titled "The Last Thing I Do".

Track listing

Production
As listed in liner notes.
Blake Chancey – tracks 7, 10
Rivers Rutherford – tracks 3, 12
Joe Scaife – tracks 2, 4, 8, 9, 11
Jeffrey Steele – tracks 1, 5, 6

Personnel
As listed in liner notes.

 Bekka Bramlett – background vocals
 Pat Buchanan – electric guitar
 Tom Bukovac – electric guitar
 Perry Coleman – background vocals
 Eric Darken – percussion
 Dan Dugmore – pedal steel guitar, lap steel guitar, acoustic guitar
 Chris Dunn – horns
 Shannon Forrest – drums
 Troy Gentry- lead vocals, background vocals
 Kenny Greenberg – electric guitar
 David Grissom – acoustic guitar, electric guitar
 Tom Hambridge – background vocals
 Tony Harrell – keyboards
 Wes Hightower – background vocals
 Mark Hill – bass guitar
 Jim Horn – horns
 Sam Levine – horns
 Eddie Montgomery- lead vocals, background vocals
 Greg Morrow – drums, percussion
 Russ Pahl – pedal steel guitar, banjo
 Billy Panda – acoustic guitar, pedal steel guitar, 12-string guitar, banjo
 Steve Patrick – horns
 Angela Primm – background vocals
 Michael Rhodes – bass guitar
 Rivers Rutherford – acoustic guitar, background vocals
 Joe Scaife – background vocals
 Jason Sellers – background vocals
 Steve Sheehan – acoustic guitar
 Jeffrey Steele – background vocals
 Bryan Sutton – 12-string banjo, bouzouki
 Gale West – background vocals
 John Willis – acoustic guitar, bouzouki
 Gretchen Wilson – background vocals
 Reese Wynans – Hammond B-3 organ, piano

Chart performance

Weekly charts

Year-end charts

Singles

Certifications

References

2004 albums
Montgomery Gentry albums
Columbia Records albums